Randall Silvis is an American novelist, playwright, screenwriter, and teacher.

Life
Born in Madison Township, Clarion County, Pennsylvania, he was educated at Clarion University and Indiana University of Pennsylvania. In 2008, Silvis was awarded an honorary Doctor of Letters from Indiana University of Pennsylvania for "a sustained career of distinguished literary achievement."

Awards
He won the Drue Heinz Literature Prize in 1984 for his first book, selected by Joyce Carol Oates. He is the recipient of two fellowships from the National Endowment for the Arts and a Fulbright Senior Scholar Research Award, plus six fellowship awards from the Pennsylvania Council on the Arts for his fiction, drama, and screenwriting. His novels An Occasional Hell and Two Days Gone were finalists for the Hammett Prize for literary excellence in crime writing from the International Association of Crime writers, and two of his short stories were nominated for a Pushcart Award. Two Days Gone and Only the Rain were both Amazon #1 Bestsellers in psychological suspense.

Books
 The Luckiest Man in the World, short stories (Pittsburgh: University of Pittsburgh Press, 1984, winner of Drue Heinz Literature Prize).
 Excelsior, novel (New York: Henry Holt, 1988).
 Under the Rainbow, novel (Sag Harbor: Permanent Press, 1993).
 An Occasional Hell, novel (Sag Harbor: Permanent Press, 1993).
 Dead Man Falling, novel (New York: Carroll & Graf, 1996).
 Mysticus, novel (Los Angeles: Wolfhawk Books, 1999).
 On Night's Shore, novel (New York: Thomas Dunne Books, 2000).
 Disquiet Heart, novel (New York: St. Martin's Minotaur, 2002). Also published as Doubly Dead, novel (2004)
 North of Unknown: Mina Hubbard's Extraordinary Expedition into the Labrador Wilderness, nonfiction (New York: The Lyons Press, 2005). Originally published as Heart So Hungry (Knopf Canada 2004)
 In a Town Called Mundomuerto, novel (Omnidawn Books, 2007)
 Hangtime, A Confession, novel (Kitsune Books, 2009)
 The Boy Who Shoots Crows, novel (Penguin/Berkley, 2011)
 Flying Fish, novel (PS Publishing UK, 2012)
 Blood & Ink, novel (Kindle Scout, 2015)
 Two Days Gone, novel (Sourcebooks, 2017)
 Only the Rain, novel (Thomas & Mercer, 2017)
 Walking the Bones, novel (Sourcebooks, 2018)
 First the Thunder, novel (Thomas & Mercer, 2018)
 A Long Way Down, novel (Sourcebooks, 2019)
 No Woods So Dark as These, novel (Sourcebooks, 2020)
 My Secret Life, short story collection (Two Suns Books, 2021)
 From the Mirror, Reflections on Living, Writing, and Dying Well, memoir (Two Suns Books, 2021)
 Marguerite & the Moon Man, novel (Amazon Vella, 2021)
 When All Light Fails, novel (Sourcebooks, 2021)
 The Deepest Black, novel (Sourcebooks, 2022)

References

 Contemporary Authors Online. The Gale Group, 2006. PEN (Permanent Entry Number):  0000091276.

1950 births
Living people
Writers from Pittsburgh
American male novelists
Novelists from Pennsylvania
People from Clarion County, Pennsylvania
Clarion University of Pennsylvania alumni